Lucecita  is a Venezuelan telenovela starred by Marina Baura, José Bardina, Esperanza Magaz and Ivonne Attas. It was produced and broadcast on Venevisión for about a year and a half, spanning 1967–1968. The original story, written by Delia Fiallo, has inspired several variations and adaptations through the years, most of them by Fiallo, both for television and cinema. In 1972, Venevisión aired its own remake.

Summary
This story is strongly based in the Cinderella mold. Yet, there are major aspects on the adaptation that make this Spanish soap opera one of the best in the history of telenovelas.

Baura makes a great performance of Lucecita, a naïve girl that leaves her impoverished, rural home to work as a maid for a wealthy and feuding family, who own a cattle-ranching land.

At this point, the man of the house is Gustavo (played by Bardina), who is married to Angelina, She is a woman pretending to be paralyzed, in order to manipulate the feelings of her husband and prevent him from leaving. But while working there, Lucecita falls in love with Gustavo. Then Angelina discovers the romance between Lucecita and Gustavo; she is full of hatred and jealousy, but after learning that Lucecita is her half-sister, her hatred towards her is even harder. But really, here is where real problems begin to arise.

Solid performances by Magaz as Modesta, Lucecita's loyal best friend, and Attas for her role of Angelina. Both reprised their respective roles in tn the 1972 version.

Main cast
Marina Baura as Lucecita
José Bardina as Gustavo
Esperanza Magaz as Modesta
Ivonne Attas as Angelina

Additional cast
In alphabetical order
Hilda Breer
Olga Castillo
María Eugenia Domínguez 
Gioia Lombardini
Oscar Mendoza
Hugo Pimentel
Suyin Rosa
Soraya Sanz
Orlando Urdaneta

Chronology

Sources

External links

Venezuelan telenovelas
1967 Venezuelan television series debuts
1968 Venezuelan television series endings
1967 telenovelas
Spanish-language telenovelas
Venevisión telenovelas
Television shows set in Venezuela